Echinocactus is a genus of cacti in the subfamily Cactoideae. The generic name derives from the Ancient Greek εχινος (echinos), meaning "spiny," and cactus.  It and Ferocactus are the two genera of barrel cactus.  Members of the genus usually have heavy spination and relatively small flowers.  The fruits are copiously woolly, and this is one major distinction between Echinocactus and Ferocactus.  Propagation is by seed.

Perhaps the best known species is the golden barrel (Echinocactus grusonii) from Mexico, an easy-to-grow and widely cultivated plant.  Though common in the houseplant and landscape industry, the golden barrel has become very rare in habitat.

Species
As of 2020, the genus includes 6 accepted species out of hundreds of plants having the name.

Formerly placed here
Astrophytum asterias (Zucc.) Lem. (as E. asterias Zucc.)
Aztekium ritteri (Boed.) Boed. (as E. ritteri Boed.)
Ferocactus wislizeni (Engelm.) Britton & Rose (as E. wislizeni Engelm.)
Lophophora williamsii (Lem. ex Salm-Dyck) J.M.Coult. (as E. williamsii Lem. ex Salm-Dyck)
Turbinicarpus subterraneus (Backeb.) A.D.Zimm. (as E. subterraneus Backeb.)

References

 Innes C, Wall B (1995). Cacti, Succulents and Bromeliads. Cassell & The Royal Horticultural Society.

External links

Jepson Manual Treatment: Echinocactus
USDA Plants Profile — Echinocactus
Flora of North America; Echinocactus
Cactus-mall.com: "Lost Peyotls"

 
Cacti of Mexico
Cacti of the United States
Cactoideae genera